East Wing is a private airline based in Almaty, Kazakhstan. The airline operates Yak-40 and Antonov-28 aircraft. 
The airline performs medical flights. Main customer "The republican center of sanitary aircraft" of the Ministry of Health of the Republic of Kazakhstan. 
Partners "The republican center of sanitary aircraft" of the Ministry of Health of the Republic of Kazakhstan.

References

Airlines of Kazakhstan
Airlines established in 2006
Airlines formerly banned in the European Union